Yaho may refer to:

Yaho, Burkina Faso
Yaho Department, Burkina Faso
Yaho Station, East Japan Railway Company station in Kunitachi, Tokyo
Yahweh

See also

Yahoo!
Yahoo (disambiguation)